The 2015 Oceania Rugby Under 20s, was the first edition of the Oceania Rugby Junior Championship. It was played as two tournaments; the Oceania Under 20 Championship hosted on the Gold Coast in Australia, and the Oceania Under 20 Trophy hosted in Suva, Fiji.

The Championship tournament was played in May and won by New Zealand, who defeated Australia by 46–29 in the last match of the round-robin competition. A planned tournament for a further six national under 20 sides was postponed, however the Trophy competition was eventually played in December and won by Fiji, who defeated Tonga by 19–10 in the last round to qualify for the World Rugby Under 20 Trophy in 2016.

Teams
The teams for the 2015 Oceania Rugby Under 20 tournaments were:

Championship

Trophy

Championship

Standings
Final competition table:
{| class="wikitable" style="text-align:center;"
|-
!width=175 |Team
!width=25 abbr="Played" |Pld
!width=25 abbr="Won" |W
!width=25 abbr="Drawn" |D
!width=25 abbr="Lost" |L
!width=32 abbr="Points for" |PF
!width=32 abbr="Points against" |PA
!width=32 abbr="Points difference" |PD
!width=25 abbr="Points" |Pts
|- bgcolor=ccffcc
|align=left|
| 3|| 3||0 ||0 ||157||43 ||+114 ||12
|-
|align=left|
| 3||2 ||0 ||1 ||109||87 ||+22 ||8
|-
|align=left|
| 3||1 ||0 ||2 ||57 ||99 ||−42 ||4
|-
|align=left|
| 3||0 ||0 ||3 ||61  ||155||−94 ||0
|-
|colspan="15"|Updated: 9 May 2015
Source: oceaniarugby.com
|}
{| class="wikitable collapsible collapsed" style="text-align:center; line-height:100%; font-size:100%; width:50%;"
|-
! colspan="4" style="border:0px" |Competition rules
|-
| colspan="4" |Points breakdown:4 points for a win2 points for a draw
Classification:Teams standings are calculated as follows:Most log points accumulated from all matchesMost log points accumulated in matches between tied teamsHighest difference between points scored for and against accumulated from all matchesMost points scored accumulated from all matches
|}
Due to stormy weather conditions the first round matches were postponed by 24 hours.

Round 1

Round 2

Round 3

Trophy

Standings
Final competition table:
{| class="wikitable" style="text-align:center;"
|-
!width=175 |Team
!width=25 abbr="Played" |Pld
!width=25 abbr="Won" |W
!width=25 abbr="Drawn" |D
!width=25 abbr="Lost" |L
!width=32 abbr="Points for" |PF
!width=32 abbr="Points against" |PA
!width=32 abbr="Points difference" |PD
!width=25 abbr="Points" |Pts
|- bgcolor=ccffcc
|align=left|
| 3|| 3||0 ||0 ||191||16 ||+175 ||12
|-
|align=left|
| 3||2 ||0 ||1 ||146||35 ||+111 ||8
|-
|align=left|
| 3||1 ||0 ||2 ||96 ||125 ||−29 ||4
|-
|align=left|
| 3||0 ||0 ||3 ||13 ||270||−257 ||0
|-
|colspan="15"|Updated: 5 December 2015
Source: oceaniarugby.com

|}
{| class="wikitable collapsible collapsed" style="text-align:center; line-height:100%; font-size:100%; width:50%;"
|-
! colspan="4" style="border:0px" |Competition rules
|-
| colspan="4" |Points breakdown:4 points for a win2 points for a draw
Classification:Teams standings are calculated as follows:Most log points accumulated from all matchesMost log points accumulated in matches between tied teamsHighest difference between points scored for and against accumulated from all matchesMost points scored accumulated from all matches
|}

See also
2015 World Rugby Under 20 Championship
2015 World Rugby Under 20 Trophy

References

External links
2015 Oceania Under 20 Rugby Championship official page
Oceania Rugby website 

2015
2015 rugby union tournaments for national teams
2015 in Oceanian rugby union
2015 in Australian rugby union
2015 in New Zealand rugby union
2015 in Samoan rugby union
2014–15 in Japanese rugby union
Sports competitions on the Gold Coast, Queensland
2015 in youth sport
International rugby union competitions hosted by Australia